Tholaria is a small village on the Greek island of Amorgos, situated on the hill, 3,5 kilometres north of the port of Aigiali.

Populated places in Naxos (regional unit)
Amorgos